The Men's 400 metre individual medley competition at the 2017 Summer Universiade was held on 26 August 2017.

Records
Prior to the competition, the existing world and Universiade records were as follows.

The following new records were set during this competition.

Results

Heats 
The heats were held at 9:32.

Final 
The final was held at 19:39.

References 

Men's 400 metre individual medley